Nisanit was the largest Israeli settlement in the northern tip of the Gaza Strip in a mini-settlement bloc including Elei Sinai and Dugit. While Nisanit was under the municipal authority of the Hof Aza Regional Council it was not physically in the Gush Katif bloc where the bulk of the 'Gush Katif' settlements were located.

History
The village was established as a Nahal military outpost in 1980 and demilitarized when turned over for civilian residential purposes in 1984 to 15 pioneer families. In 1993, its status was changed to 'urban community'. Nisanit also served as a satellite municipal branch of the regional council for the three northern Gaza Strip settlements. The name of the town is the Hebrew translation of the hawksbeard flower which is widespread in the area's sand dunes in spring.

Nisanit, which numbered about 300 families (around 900 people), was one of the few 'mixed' Gush Katif settlements with Orthodox and non-religious Jews living together.

Unilateral disengagement
Nisanit's residents were evicted on 21 August 2005 by Israeli Army and Israeli Police personnel as part of the unilateral disengagement plan. The houses were destroyed and the area was abandoned.

Drive to rebuild
On July 26, 2007, some 500 activists, including former residents, attempted to return to the ruins as a beginning to rebuilding the community. Police attempted to stop the march before it reached the Gaza border but did not succeed though several arrests were made. Organizers vowed to continue plans for a future return to Nisanit.

References

Populated places established in 1984
Former Israeli settlements in the Gaza Strip
Nahal settlements
Villages depopulated during the Arab–Israeli conflict
1993 establishments in the Palestinian territories
2005 disestablishments in the Palestinian territories